16807 is the natural number following 16806 and preceding 16808.


In mathematics
As a number of the form nn − 2 (16807 = 75), it can be applied in Cayley's formula to count the number of trees with seven labeled nodes.

In other fields
 Several authors have suggested a Lehmer random number generator:

References

External links
 16807 : facts & properties

16807